The Beans of Egypt, Maine (also known as Forbidden Choices) is a 1994 indie drama film directed by Jennifer Warren and starring Martha Plimpton, Kelly Lynch and Rutger Hauer. The film is based on the novel of the same name by Carolyn Chute.

Plot
Set in the rural town of Egypt, Maine, the Bean family is a large, partly inbred, backwater family who are poor, proud, hated by all in the local community, but alive in the sense that they struggle against their lot and support each other in time of trouble. One member of the large family is Reuben Bean, an alcoholic and brawler who frequently runs afoul of the law. He has a wife named Roberta, and nine children. All this is observed by Earlene, a young woman who lives with her widowed father across the street from the Beans' trailer. The view from her window has been better than any daytime television soap opera since she was a little girl; especially that of a shirtless Beal Bean, Reuben's nephew. Earlene's highly religious father warns her against any contact with the Bean family, but despite the Beans' crude ways, the young woman is drawn to them. Their earthiness, directness, and unity stand in sharp contrast to her oppressive family life.

When Reuben is sent to prison for resisting arrest for out-of-season deer hunting, Beal takes up with Reuben's wife Roberta. Beal also has a short tryst with Earlene, who becomes pregnant after a one-time sexual encounter with him, which results in her being disowned by her father and leads her to marry Beal and move in with him at his trailer. After Earlene gives birth to a daughter, and later to another baby boy, her marriage with Beal begins to fall apart due to Beal's continuing infatuation with Roberta, further complicated by extreme poverty and Beal's pride at his refusal to accept welfare or any handouts.

Beal's short temper and his abusive nature soon gets the best of him as he begins drinking and beating Earlene when things get worse for them. After getting into another drunken brawl with some locals, the police are called to Beal's trailer when after he threatens them with his hunting rifle, the police shoot him dead in self defense. With Earlene now alone to raise her five-year-old daughter and one-year-old son all by herself, she finds some hope in the final scene when Reuben arrives after being released from prison. After Reuben learns about his nephew's death, he has a heart-to-heart talk with Earlene and agrees to help support her and Beal's two children the best that he can.

Cast
 
 Martha Plimpton as Earlene Pomerleau
 Rae Adams as young Earlene Pomerleau
 Kelly Lynch as Roberta Bean
 Rutger Hauer as Reuben Bean
 Patrick McGaw as Beal Bean
 Lance Robinson as young Beal Bean
 Richard Sanders as Lee Pomerleau
 Ariana Lamon-Anderson as Bonnie Loo
 Michael MacRae as Cole Deveraux
 Susanna Burney as Merry Merry
  James Gervasi as Pa Bean
  Jennifer Warren as Cop

References

External links

1994 drama films
1994 films
American drama films
American Playhouse
1990s English-language films
1990s American films
1994 independent films
American independent films
Films based on American novels
Films set in Maine